Lewis Field can refer to several locations.

Locations

Airports
Hancock County Airport in Hancock County, Kentucky is also known as Ron Lewis Field
McComb-Pike County Airport in Pike County, Mississippi is also known as John E. Lewis Field

Research facility
John H. Glenn Research Center at Lewis Field, a NASA research center in Ohio

Sports stadiums
 Boone Pickens Stadium at Oklahoma State University was previously called Lewis Field
 Lewis Field (Fort Hays State University) is a sports stadium in Hays, Kansas
 Buddy Lewis Field, a baseball stadium at Sims Legion Park in Gastonia, North Carolina

People
 Fielding Lewis, Brother-in-law to George Washington